Thismia melanomitra is a species of plant in the Burmanniaceae family. It is endemic to Ecuador.  Its natural habitat is subtropical or tropical moist lowland forests. It is threatened by habitat loss.

References

Burmanniaceae
Flora of Ecuador
Vulnerable plants
Taxonomy articles created by Polbot